Śaucam is a Sanskrit word that translates into English as "cleanliness" or "purity" of the body and mind.  It is a core principle of Hinduism, particularly (although certainly not exclusively) within the Gaudiya Vaishnava tradition.  It is considered to be one of the primary pillars of dharma, repeatedly stressed as essential or highly desirable for spiritual advancement.

Sanskrit words and phrases